The 2010 Clipsal 500 was the third event of the 2010 V8 Supercar Championship Series and the twelfth running of the Adelaide 500. It was held on the weekend of 11–14 March on the streets of Adelaide, in South Australia.

Holden Racing Team driver Garth Tander won his second Adelaide 500, winning both races, salvaging his season after a poor start in the Middle-Eastern leg of the championship. Second in both races was leading Ford competitor, Dick Johnson Racing's James Courtney. The remaining podium positions were shared by Lee Holdsworth for Garry Rogers Motorsport on Saturday and Ford Performance Racing lead driver Mark Winterbottom on Sunday.


Race results

Qualifying Race 5

Qualifying timesheets:

Race 5
Race timesheets:

Qualifying Race 6

Qualifying timesheets:

Race 6
Race timesheets:

Standings
 After Race 6 of 26

Source

References

External links
Adelaide 500 website

Adelaide 500
Clipsal
2010s in Adelaide